Goodnight, Vienna is a 1932 British musical film directed by Herbert Wilcox and starring Jack Buchanan, Anna Neagle and Gina Malo. Two lovers in Vienna are separated by the First World War, but are later reunited.

Based on a radio operetta written by Eric Maschwitz, it features the song "Good-night, Vienna". Wilcox reportedly cast Neagle, whom he would later marry and direct in many films, after discovering her by chance in a stage show.

Plot

Max is an Austrian officer in the army and son of a highly placed general. His father wants him to marry a Countess but he has fallen in love with Vicki. Attending a party given in his honour, they are informed that war has broken out. Max writes a note to Vicki and goes off to war. Unfortunately the note is lost. Some time after the war, Max is just a shoe shop assistant while Vicki is now a famous singer. They meet and at first she snubs him but then falls in love with him again.

Cast
 Jack Buchanan - Captain Maximilian Schletoff
 Anna Neagle - Vicki
 Gina Malo - Frieda
 Clive Currie - General Schletoff
 William Kendall - Ernst
 Joyce Bland - Countess Helga
 Gibb McLaughlin - Max's Orderly
 Herbert Carrick - Johann
 Clifford Heatherley - Donelli
 O. B. Clarence - Theatre Manager
 Peggy Cartwright - Greta
 Muriel Aked - Marya
 Aubrey Fitzgerald - Waiter

Production
Herbert Wilcox was played the score by Eric Maschwitz and George Posford. He liked it and bought the rights. Within a week Wilcox persuaded Jack Buchanan to play the lead. He wanted Lea Seidl or Evelyn Lane to play the female lead but neither was available. He went to tell Buchanan that the film was going to be postponed; Buchanan was playing in a show Stand Up and Sing with Anna Neagle. Wilcox was impressed by Neagle and cast her at a fee of £150. The film was shot in three weeks before Buchanan had to leave to appear in Stand Up and Sing at Liverpool. During the making of the film, Wilcox and Neagle fell in love

Reception
The film was Wilcox's most commercially successful until that time.

Cultural References

 In the TV Series Rising Damp the lead character Rigsby often puts his cat Vienna out with the phrase Goodnight, Vienna
 The phrase is used in the TV Movie Housewife, 49 when someone passes away
 Goodnight Vienna is the title of the fourth album by ex-Beatle Ringo Starr
 In the opening scene of the Jeeves and Wooster episode The Purity of the Turf, Hugh Laurie, in the character of Bertie Wooster, sings fragments of the film's title song 
 In the BBC's Sherlock, "The Great Game" (Series 1: Episode 3), Benedict Cumberbatch's Sherlock examines a corpse, saying, "Nasty wound. Tetanus bacteria enters the bloodstream... Good night, Vienna."
In the video game Bloons Tower Defense 6, upon seeing a B.A.D, the hero Benjamin will simply say "Goodnight, Vienna."

References
Notes

Bibliography
 Street, Sarah. British National Cinema. Routledge, 2009.

External links

1932 films
1932 musical films
British musical films
Films directed by Herbert Wilcox
Operetta films
Films set in the 1910s
Films set in Vienna
British World War I films
British black-and-white films
British and Dominions Studios films
Films shot at Imperial Studios, Elstree
1930s British films